Murder at Dawn is a 1932 American Pre-Code film directed by Richard Thorpe. The film is also known as The Death Ray in the United Kingdom.

Cast
Jack Mulhall as Danny
Josephine Dunn as Doris Farrington
Eddie Boland as Freddie
Marjorie Beebe as Gertrude
Martha Mattox as The Housekeeper
Mischa Auer as Henry
Phillips Smalley as Judge Folger
Crauford Kent as Arnstein
Frank Ball as Dr. Farrington
Alfred Cross as Goddard

External links

1932 films
American mystery films
1930s English-language films
American black-and-white films
1932 mystery films
Films directed by Richard Thorpe
1930s American films